Brunello Bertolin (born 1 June 1943) is a former Italian male long-distance runner who competed at one editions of the IAAF World Cross Country Championships (1973), and won the national championships at senior level.

References

External links
 Brunello Bertolin profile at All-Athletics

1943 births
Living people
Italian male long-distance runners
Italian male steeplechase runners
Italian male cross country runners